TetGen is a mesh generator developed by Hang Si which is designed to partition any 3D geometry into tetrahedrons by employing a form of Delaunay triangulation whose algorithm was developed by the author.

TetGen has since been incorporated into other software packages such as Mathematica and Gmsh.

Some improvement by speed in quality in Version 1.6 were introduced.

See also
 Gmsh
 Salome (software)

References

External links
 Weierstrass Institute: Hang Si's personal homepage

Numerical analysis software for Linux
Cross-platform software
Mesh generators
Numerical analysis software for macOS
Numerical analysis software for Windows
Free mathematics software
Free software programmed in C++
Cross-platform free software